Benoni Aubert ( 4 August 1768 – 21 April 1832) was a Norwegian military officer born in Denmark.

Biography
He was born in Copenhagen, Denmark. His parents were Major General Jacques Xavier Aubert (1727-1793) and Julane Cathrine Bang (1748-1834). His father was born in France and emigrated to Denmark in 1752 to take up a career  in the Royal Danish Army.

After graduating at the Royal Danish Military Academy in Copenhagen, he became an officer in 1784 and Major from 1818. He served as Chief of Engineering in Kronborg from 1806 to 1810. From 1811–17, he was a commander at Kongsvinger Fortress and Blaker Fortress in Norway. In 1814, he was also Chief of the Engineer Regiment. From 1822 to 1823, he was the chief of the Norwegian Military Academy.

Personal life
He was married in 1797 to Jakobine Henriette Thaulow (1776-1833), daughter of  Kristiansand city official  Henrik Arnold Thaulow (1722-1799) and his wife Jacobine (Christie) Thaulow (1746-1818). Around 1815,  he changed his surname to Aubert.  He and his wife  were the parents of ten children. Their children included professor Ludvig Cæsar Martin Aubert (1807–1887)  and  jurist  Michael Conrad Sophus Emil Aubert (1811–1872).

See also
Aubert (noble family)

References

1768 births
1832 deaths
People from Copenhagen
Norwegian Army personnel
Norwegian military engineers
Norwegian cartographers
Norwegian military personnel of the Napoleonic Wars
Norwegian people of French descent
d'Aubert family